Julio Sandoval (born 13 June 1971) is a Guatemalan sports shooter. He competed in the men's 10 metre running target event at the 1992 Summer Olympics.

References

1971 births
Living people
Guatemalan male sport shooters
Olympic shooters of Guatemala
Shooters at the 1992 Summer Olympics
Place of birth missing (living people)
Pan American Games medalists in shooting
Pan American Games silver medalists for Guatemala
Shooters at the 1991 Pan American Games
Medalists at the 1991 Pan American Games